Shadow Lass is a superheroine appearing in books published by DC Comics. She first appeared as a statue in Adventure Comics #354 (March 1967), and was created by Jim Shooter and Curt Swan. She was called Shadow Woman, was depicted as Caucasian, and as having been killed in action defending the science asteroid, in an adult Legion story. Her official first appearance is Adventure Comics #365 (February 1968).

Fictional character biography
Her real name is Tasmia Mallor and her homeworld is Talok VIII. Her mother's name is Tarna Tolarn-Mallor. She has the power to project darkness. Like all Talokians native to Talok VIII, she has dark blue skin and pointed ears. The Talokians of Talok III such as Mikaal Tomas have light blue skin. She and her cousin Grev (Shadow Kid) received their powers from their ancestors, whose spirits reside in a cave on Talok VIII (Talokians practice ancestor worship). As her ancestors before her from the past thousand years, Tasmia is the hereditary shadow champion of Talok VIII. Her 20th century ancestors, Lydea Mallor and Lyrissa Mallor, were also shadow champions and members of the interstellar police force L.E.G.I.O.N.

Her cousin Grev, who also wielded the shadow power thanks to his bloodline, went on to join the Legion Academy as Shadow Kid, though aware that he could never join the team while she was an active member (due to the LSH rules regarding duplication of powers), he hoped to be better prepared to protect Talok in Tasmia's absence.

Shadow Lass joined the Legion after her homeworld was invaded by the Fatal Five. She helped the Legion to defeat them. After joining, she became romantically involved with Lar Gand and eventually married him after he was mortally wounded fighting the Time Trapper as part of the conspiracy to avenge Superboy's death at the Trapper's hands. Their marriage was rocky for many years despite their strong feelings for each other, and Tasmia went into mourning when Gand died. The mourning was temporary, as he returned to her, inhabited briefly by the Time Trapper's essence, until a cataclysmic battle erased the Trapper from existence and completely rewrote reality.

1994 reboot

In 1994, after the Zero Hour event, the Legion of Superheroes continuity was restarted. In this storyline, Shadow Lass used the codename Umbra and exhibited a much more aggressive and businesslike attitude. While Umbra never became involved with the Post-ZH reimagining of Lar Gand, she did make several attempts to garner his attention, only to be rebuffed.

Empowerment
Tasmia Mallor was the latest in a long line of Shadow Champions of Talok VIII. At birth she was taken from her mother, the then-current Champion, in a bid to ensure that no single accident or attack could ever claim both of them, and saw her only seven times during her lifetime, all at solemn ceremonies in which they were forbidden to speak. As she grew up, she was raised by priests and was trained in combat and drilled in the order of her bloodline.

Finally, one day, her mother was killed in battle and she was brought before the leaders of Talok VIII's twelve tribes - the only time they would ever congregate peacefully - before entering the Shadow Cave, where she met the spirits of her mother and the other prior Champions. After they chastised her for never wondering how her mother died, she took to heart their counsel to protect Talok VIII (but not their warning against egocentrism) and they told her to Go In Power.

On leaving the cave, she found the inhabitants of Talok VIII on their knees, waiting for a sign - which she provided when she let the Shadows loose. After that, she became the Champion, using her position to give orders to leaders and priests, all in maintenance of the Old Ways. This lasted until the ship came.

The United Planets ship came in peace, proselytizing the benefits of U.P. membership. Sent to greet the "invaders", she understood none of it, and she set about dismantling the "hideous" ship and crew.  Despite their best efforts, she caused an explosion that caused the ship's landing gear to collapse. After that, the priests (who had already been harboring doubts about the "zealot") kept her drugged until UP entry negotiations were complete. Profoundly disturbed by the cultural influx and Talok's "captitulance", she was eventually "dismissed", and told to study the galaxy to "open her mind".

Legion
She eventually made her way to Earth, and entered the Legion tryouts and was accepted as Umbra, although her curt attitude irritated Sensor. As part of the Legion, she fought Mordru, and later played a key part in saving Wildfire - despite, after her initial fierce compassion, being disgusted at the thought of the forcible integration of his two original souls.

Blighted
Far later, the Blight enslaved most of Earth, including all but a few of the Legionnaires. Umbra was not among these escapees. When she was freed, she began to have a mental breakdown, prompted not only by the fact of her enslavement and what she'd been forced to do, but by the fact that the Blight's touching of her mind had meant that she'd enjoyed it. Shortly thereafter, she became one of the Legionnaires lost through a space rift and catapulted into another galaxy.

There, she became harder and colder than ever in lieu of breaking down completely and showing the fear that now guided her, while the voices of her ancestors from the shadow became faint and hard to understand. Then Saturn Girl tried to telepathically calm her, and it all went wrong - a telepathic matrix over a whole planet interfered with her powers, and the result left Saturn Girl in a coma, a shadow-creature fueled by Umbra and Saturn Girl's combined pain and fear loose on the ship - and an Umbra completely without pain or anxiety, leaving only anger and arrogant self-confidence.

She went down to the planet, where she began to fight Singularity (a Superman-like being), for whom the telepathic illusion which had caused the trouble was being maintained (to keep him from causing trouble on his race's real planet). When Ultra Boy and Monstress went down to get her, she began to fight them too. Finally, she was knocked out by Singularity while the Legion, having captured the shadow-creature and realized what it was, knocked out the illusion causing Singularity to go looking for his original planet. Then Brainiac 5 managed to restore Umbra and Saturn Girl's minds, and Umbra finally broke down in a crying heap.

Recovery
After this she finally began to heal from everything that had happened to her - until, after they managed to return to UP space, her power mysteriously cut out. To find out what had happened, she finally returned to Talok VIII for the first time since her dismissal. There she found a planet completely cloaked in shadow, and a shadow which knocked her out. Shadow Maven, one of the priests who had trained her, found her and told her that after her loss in the rift, they had believed her dead and managed to empower her "distant cousin Grev" with the shadows through the use of technology, and had him cloak the planet completely, withdrawing from the United Planets.

Angry at the thought that just as she had accepted the galaxy Talok had turned away from it, she went to confront Grev. The shadow gradually leeched back to her, until she split open the suit Grev used to control the shadow - and found a withered corpse inside, as he had been unable to withstand being a conduit for the Shadow, while the suit ran on its last programmed directives. She cast the shadow-cloak from the planet, and spent some time there before returning to the Legion.

2004 reboot

In 2004, the Legion continuity was again restarted. Shadow Lass has appeared in this reimagining, but little has been revealed about this version of the character. She is portrayed as a very aggressive warrior. At one point, she was in a relationship with Karate Kid, but they had broken up by the time the series started. She has been dating Ultra Boy.

When the Legion visited Talok VIII, they were surprised at the degree of favor Shadow Lass commanded, including a large banquet in her honor. Tasmia explained that if the Shadow Champion did not accept such gifts, people would see her as aloof. Nonetheless, this inspired Atom Girl to suggest Shadow Lass run for Legion leader on a hedonism platform.

Tasmia also has a friendly rivalry with Grev, who in this continuity is her brother, rather than cousin.

Post-Infinite Crisis: Retroboot Legion

The events of the Infinite Crisis miniseries have apparently restored a close analogue of the Pre-Crisis Legion to continuity, as seen in "The Lightning Saga" story arc in Justice League of America and Justice Society of America, and in the "Superman and the Legion of Super-Heroes" story arc in Action Comics.  Shadow Lass is included in their number, and is among the group of Legionnaires who help Superman defeat the villainous Justice League of Earth in the "Action Comics" storyline.

During the Justice League of Earth's xenophobic reign, Night Girl and Shadow Lass worked with Timber Wolf and Lightning Lass to help thousands of extraterrestrials escape Earth to their home planets via an "underground" interstellar portal zone. Shady also debuts a reworked version of her classic Grell-era bikini in the Action Comics arc, and uses her shadow-casting powers in tandem with Night Girl's only-in-darkness super strength.

Shadow Lass is shown prominently in the teaser image for the "Final Crisis: Legion of Three Worlds" mini-series, using her powers to keep Mordru and Saturn Queen in the dark.

In the first issue of "Final Crisis: Legion of Three Worlds", Shadow Lass, along with fellow Legionnaires Phantom Girl and Lightning Lass, rescue Mon-El from the Phantom Zone, where he had been imprisoned by Earth Man and the villainous Justice League of Earth. Upon leaving the Zone, Mon-El once again suffers the effects of lead poisoning, but as in the past, is inoculated with an antidote created by Brainiac 5.

Recently in issue #2 of the new Legion comic, Shadow Lass appears to have broken up with Mon-El, with no reason truly given. In #5, she is seen in bed with the reformed xenophobe Earth-Man. When she found out that Mon-El was chosen to be a Green Lantern, she felt a bit uneasy about it. However Mon-El told her that even though he's part of the Corps, the Legion and Earth will always be his family.

In the "Watchmen" sequel "Doomsday Clock", Shadow Lass is among the Legion of Super-Heroes members that appear in the present after Doctor Manhattan undid the experiment that erased the Legion of Super-Heroes and the Justice Society of America.

Powers and abilities

Shadow Lass in all her incarnations can cast dark fields that block all light. These can either be complete, effectively rendering useless all light sources within the area, or hollow to allow the interior to be lit. She can also solidify these fields, to use as a more direct weapon.

She is also an expert hand-to-hand combatant, and can see in complete darkness (both her own and otherwise).

Equipment
As a member of the Legion of Super-Heroes, she is provided a Legion Flight Ring. It allows her to fly and protects her from the vacuum of space and other dangerous environments.

In other media
 Shadow Lass makes a cameo appearance in the Justice League Unlimited episode "Far From Home".
 Shadow Lass makes a cameo appearance in the final scene of Justice League vs. the Fatal Five, as one of the Legionnaires travelling to the 21st century to honor their fallen member Star Boy.
 Shadow Lass appears in the 2023 Tomorrowverse film Legion of Super-Heroes, voiced by Victoria Grace.

References

External links
SHADOW LASS at the LEGION Collection
Cosmic Teams: Shadow Lass
A Hero History Of Shadow Lass

Characters created by Curt Swan
Characters created by Jim Shooter
Comics characters introduced in 1968
DC Comics aliens
DC Comics extraterrestrial superheroes
DC Comics female superheroes